Ahmadabad-e Olya (also Romanized as Aḩmadābād-e ‘Olyā and Aḩmadābād ‘Olya; also known as Ahmad Ābād and Aḩmadābād-e Bālā) is a village in Ahmadabad Rural District, Takht-e Soleyman District, Takab County, West Azerbaijan Province, Iran. At the 2006 census, its population was 471, in 96 families.

References 

Populated places in Takab County